The Wilson Mountains ( are a group of mountains including Hjort Massif, rising to approximately  to the west of Merz Peninsula, Black Coast, Palmer Land in Antarctica. The feature is bounded to the west by the Du Toit Mountains, to the north by Beaumont Glacier and Hilton Inlet, and to the south by Defant Glacier.

First photographed from the air by USAS, 1940. Mapped by USGS from U.S. Navy aerial photographs taken 1966–69. In association with the names of continental drift scientists grouped in this area, named by US-ACAN after John Tuzo Wilson (1908–93), Canadian geophysicist who visited Antarctica on US Navy Operation Deep Freeze, 1958. Wilson was professor of Geophysics, University of Toronto, 1946–74 and Director-General, Ontario Science Centre, 1974–85.

References

Mountain ranges of Palmer Land